Ōban is a feudal Japanese gold unit of currency. It may also refer to:

Ōban (Great Watch), a troop contingent of feudal Japan
Ōban (printing), a Japanese measurement of woodblock printing from the Tokugawa period
Ōban Star-Racers (2006), a French-Japanese animated television series